Pineda is a small village in the municipality of Coyuca de Catalan, state of Guerrero, Mexico.

Its history goes back to indigenous peoples, known as the Talistaca. Shortly after the Spanish Conquest, a family with the surname Pineda built haciendas on the lands formerly occupied by the Talistaca. These eventually developed into a village, which was named after the family.

According to data from the Instituto Nacional de Estadística y Geografía, the census of 2005 showed Pineda with a population of 842 inhabitants, of whom 413 were men and 429 women.

Populated places in Guerrero
es:Pineda (Guerrero)